Maestro is a 1989 novella written by Australian author Peter Goldsworthy. It is a bildungsroman novel dealing with themes of art and life.

The book was shortlisted for the 1990 Miles Franklin Award. It has been translated into German, and is a set text on year-twelve syllabuses in several Australian states. It was chosen for the inaugural Australian "One Book—One Town" project. In 2003, it appeared as number 22 on the Australian Society of Authors' list of the top-forty Australian books ever published.

Plot summary

The protagonist, a boy called Paul Crabbe, is taught piano by his teacher (or maestro), Eduard Keller. Paul dislikes his teacher at first, but by the end of the book has grown to appreciate him dearly. Paul learns the limits of his own musical ability through Keller, but he also grows to understand himself and Keller enough to write the novel. He also has a loving relationship with his sweetheart, Rosie.

This book has an ongoing theme of contrasts, including the difference's between Paul's mother and father; Vienna and Darwin; high culture vs. low culture; and the contrast of Paul as an adolescent and Paul as an adult. Throughout the narration, Paul slowly comes to realization that he is now learning from the maestro, and his talent starts growing day by day.

The maestro, Eduard Keller, lost his family during The Holocaust, despite performing private concerts for Adolf Hitler in the belief that he would spare Keller's Jewish family.

For Keller, the grand piano is his sanctity and security, helping him deal with the horrors of the world "safe beneath that grand piano", and likewise offering him a way of deconstructing life. As Paul matures, Keller's phrasings, which seemed absurd in adolescence, ossify into a "musical bible whose texts I knew by heart"..

Keller originates from Vienna, where he was a renowned musician "becoming so visible so that nothing can touch him", therefore believing he is exempt from the effects of war. Eventually, he lost his wife and son, leading him to disappear from the country and leaving everyone believing he was dead. Filled with remorse and regret, Keller transforms and evolves to become a completely different man, "if we are discussing the same man how different our two versions". Keller understands the frivolities and foolish nature of human society, passed onto Paul in the form of clippings from newspapers, Keller's "textbooks". "The thousands of stories of human foolishness and greed and cruelty that he had tried to patch together into some kind of understanding of his fellow beings" depicts Keller's knowledge.

When Paul initially began lessons with Keller, his first impressions were misleading, as Keller has "a boozers incandescent glow" and "I'd seen nothing like him before." As Paul matures, his attitudes towards the Maestro become warmer and they develop an unexpressed bond. "I slipped my arm beneath his head and kissed him" represent Paul's final realisation of his connection with Keller in death. Throughout his life, Paul took the Maestro for granted, believing his advice was "irritating – and also contradictory". After Keller's death, Paul realises the opportunities Keller had presented him. "Mourning for a great man, yes, but also mourning for myself – for times and possibilities that will never come again." Throughout the novella the tone shifts from egotism and selfishness to regret and wisdom depicting Paul's growth.

Maestro has themes of adolescence and growing up. Paul is educated about life through music and Keller's experiences in Vienna and understanding of human nature. The book tracks Paul as he develops into a responsible, mature man from an obnoxious, egotistical teenager.

Adaptations
On 27 February 2009 the State Theatre Company of South Australia presented the premiere of a stage adaptation prepared by Goldsworthy's daughter Anna at Her Majesty's Theatre in Adelaide.

References

External links
 Teacher's notes on Maestro, Prepared by Kay Perry

1989 Australian novels
Australian bildungsromans
Angus & Robertson books
Books by Peter Goldsworthy